The Lumbricidae are a family of earthworms. About 33 lumbricid species have become naturalized around the world, but the bulk of the species are in the Holarctic region: from Canada (e.g. Bimastos lawrenceae on Vancouver Island) and the United States (e.g. Eisenoides carolinensis, Eisenoides lonnbergi and most Bimastos spp.) and throughout Eurasia to Japan (e.g. Eisenia japonica, E. koreana and Helodrilus hachiojii).  An enigmatic species in Tasmania is Eophila eti.  Currently, 670 valid species and subspecies in about 42 genera are recognized. This family includes the majority of earthworm species well known to Europeans.

Genera
The family consists of the following genera:

 Allolobophora Eisen, 1874
 Alpodinaridella Mršić, 1987
 Aporrectodea Orley, 1885
 Bimastos Moore, 1893
 Castellodrilus Qiu & Bouché, 1998 stat. nov.
 Cataladrilus Qiu & Bouché, 1998
 Cernosvitovia Omodeo, 1956
 Creinella Mršić, 1986
 Dendrobaena Eisen, 1874
 Eisenia Malm, 1877
 Eiseniella Michaelsen, 1900
 Eiseniona Omodeo, 1956
 Eophila Rosa, 1893
 Ethnodrilus Bouché, 1972
 Eumenescolex Qiu & Bouché, 1998
 Fitzingeria Zicsi, 1978
 Gatesona Qiu & Bouché, 1998
 Healyella Omodeo & Rota, 1989
 Helodrilus Hoffmeister, 1845
 Heraclescolex Qiu & Bouché, 1998
 Iberoscolex Qiu & Bouché, 1998
 Italobalkaniona Mršić & Šapkarev, 1988
 Kenleenus Qiu & Bouché, 1998
 Kritodrilus Dumnicka, 1983
 Lumbricus Linnaeus, 1758
 Meroandriella Mršić, 1987
 Octodriloides Zicsi, 1986
 Octodrilus Omodeo, 1956
 Octolasion Örley, 1885
 Octolasium Michaelsen, 1900
 Omilurus Templeton, 1836
 Orodrilus Bouché, 1972
 Perelia Easton, 1983
 Philomontanus Bozorgi, Seiedy, Malek, Aira, Pérez-Losada & Domínguez, 2019
 Pietromodeona Qiu & Bouché, 1998
 Postandrilus Qiu & Bouché, 1998
 Proctodrilus Zicsi, 1985
 Prosellodrilus Bouché, 1972
 Reynoldsia Qiu & Bouché, 1998
 Satchellius Gates, 1975
 Scherotheca Bouché, 1972
 Spermophorodrilus Bouché, 1975
 Tetragonurus Eisen, 1874
 Zophoscolex Qiu & Bouché, 1998

Range 
The worms in the Lumbricidae family originate from Europe, but over time members of the family have since been introduced and spread around the globe.

Europe 
Members of the Lumbricidae family are native to Europe and are most diverse in southern Europe. There are 30 species from the family in Ireland and Britain. Notably, a single mature individual of the species Prosellodrilus amplisetosus was found in a survey of soil biodiversity in Ireland. P. amplisetosis had never been recorded in Ireland before and is commonly found in France or Spain. It is thought to have been introduced by humans through agricultural supplies. Another interesting case is of the species Dendrobaena attemsi in Scandinavia. They were first found in a national park in Sweden, the furthest north the species have been found. The discovery of D. attemsi implies the range of the species is increasing north. It is not only in Sweden that species from the Lumbricidae family are expanding their range. Many of the species found in Finland are exhibiting similar increases in range and Lumbricidae worms are also expanding into Northeastern Europe, starting from the near Baltic sea.

A 2022 molecular phylogenetic study of the highly diverse Franco-Iberian genus Zophoscolex showed most of the Iberian species to form a distinct clade, formally described as Castellodrilus stat. nov.. Other species were moved to the genera Cataladrilus and Compostelandrilus, with the remaining species remaining in Zophoscolex restricted to French representatives.

Asia 
Worms from the Lumbricidae family make up the majority of earthworms found in China, despite not being native to the area.

At higher elevations in India, some species of Lumbicidae can be found.

North America 
When European settlers came to North America, so did European earthworms like the Lumbricidae. Before this, the area in North America where glaciers had been were mostly worm-free. Lumbricidae worms are known to be expanding into the Great Lakes Region. The introduced worms have an impact on the native species and environments. Species from the Lumbricidae family, such as Lumbricus rubelles, are believed to have displaced the local species in a number of regions. In others, Lumbricidae species outnumber the native species in terms of biomass. Despite this, they are not as productive, in terms of processing nitrogen and phosphorus, as the native species. Lumbricidae worms also tend to have a higher species richness than native North American worms, though the species richness of both the native and Lumbricidae decreases with increasing latitudes.

New Zealand and Australia 
Similar to North America, worms from the Lumbricidae family were introduced to New Zealand and Australia by European settlers.

Predators 
Harvestmen, especially from the genera Leiobunum and Hadrobunus, are known to consume Lumbricidae earthworms. This happens mostly in temperate regions. Another species known to prey on Lumbricidae is the Bannan caecilian. Lumbricidae are an important part of its diet.

References

External links 

 Earthworm Society of Britain – information on British earthworms

 
Haplotaxida
Annelid families